Nashorn is a  German tank destroyer of World War II.

Nashorn may also refer to:

 Nashorn (JavaScript engine), software by Oracle

See also
 Nashorn, Zebra & Co., a German television series